The Vatican Telephone Service was first officially established in 1930. In 2002, it became part of the Governorate's Department of Telecommunication and oversees all telecommunications needs of Vatican City.

The assigned telephone code/country code for Vatican City is +379. But this code is not used. Instead, the Vatican city uses the country code +39 of Italy and assigns phone numbers starting with 698 within the regional code 06 for Rome.

See also

Telephone numbers in Vatican City

References

Communications in Vatican City
Government agencies established in 1930